A Celtic union refers to political unity between the Celtic nations.

Historical proposals 
In 1864, Charles De Gaulle he proposed a Celtic Union that would establish and develop links between Celtic countries. There should also be a Celtic "Esperanto" to facilitate communication and which would be created from common elements in all Celtic languages and a Pan-Celtic festival.

Modern proposals 
A Celtic union has been proposed as an alternative to Brexit.

Following the Brexit referendum there were calls for Pan-Celtic Unity. In November 2016, the First Minister of Scotland, Nicola Sturgeon stated the idea of a "Celtic Corridor" of the island of Ireland and Scotland appealed to her. Some have proposed this as a potential link for a Celtic union.

In January 2019 the leader of the Welsh nationalist Plaid Cymru party, Adam Price spoke in favour of cooperation among the Celtic nations of Britain and Ireland following Brexit. Among his proposals were a Celtic Development Bank for joint infrastructure and investment projects in energy, transport and communications in Ireland, Wales, Scotland, and the Isle of Man, and the foundation of a Celtic union, the structure of which is already existent in the Good Friday Agreement according to Price. Speaking to RTÉ, the Irish national broadcaster he proposed Wales and Ireland working together to promote the indigenous languages of each nation. 

Journalist Jamie Dalgety has also proposed the concept of a Celtic Union involving Scotland and Ireland but suggests that lack of support for Welsh independence may mean that a Gaelic Celtic Union involving may be more appropriate. 

Bangor University lecturer and journalist, Ifan Morgan Jones has suggested that "a short-term fix for Wales, Scotland and Northern Ireland might be a greater degree of cooperation with each other, as a union within a union." he also suggested that "If they could find a way of working together in their mutual interest, that’s a fair degree of combined influence, particular if the next General Election produces a hung parliament."

In a Plaid Cymru conference in 2019, leader of Sinn Fein, Mary Loud McDonald stated "We need a pan-celtic anti-Tory political culture. A shared political culture that respects each other’s sovereignty and right to nationhood. A shared political culture grounded in principles of common interest and common purpose." She echoed these views in a supportive video message to YesCymru in 2022.

See also 
The concept of Pan-Celticism
Celtic union may also refer to:
A pan-Celticist society founded in 1853 by Robert Cane (active 1853–1858)
A pan-Celticist society founded by a faction of the Celtic Congress in 1947 (active 1947–1950), see Celtic Congress

References 

Inter-Celtic organisations
Celtic nationalism
Proposed political unions
National unifications